Ralph Deleon Guerrero Torres (born August 6, 1979) is a Northern Marianan politician, who served as the ninth governor of the Northern Mariana Islands, from December 29, 2015 to January 9, 2023. He is a Republican from Saipan, Commonwealth of the Northern Mariana Islands (CNMI). The third longest-serving governor in CNMI history, Torres took office upon the death of Governor Eloy Inos on December 29, 2015 before being reelected as governor in his own right in 2018. He previously served as the tenth lieutenant governor, having been elected to that post in 2014.

Early life and education 
Torres was born on August 6, 1979 to a Chamorro family in Garapan, then part of the Trust Territory of the Pacific Islands. Torres's father was a government field officer and Commonwealth Utilities Corporation (CUC) dispatcher, while his mother was a teacher at William S. Reyes Elementary School. Growing up, Torres lived with his parents and five siblings in a one-story house in Koblerville built by the family.

Torres's family would later move to Boise, Idaho, where he would attend Boise High School, graduating in 1996. He received a B.S. in political science from Boise State University in 2001. In 2004, he began to work with his brothers at Torres Brothers, Attorneys at Law.

Early political career

Commonwealth Legislature 
In 2008, Torres won election to the Northern Mariana Islands House of Representatives. In 2010, he won election to the Northern Mariana Islands Senate, acting in a variety of roles. From 2010 to 2015 he was chairman of the Health & Welfare Committee. In February 2013, he became the president of the Senate.

Lieutenant Governorship 
In the 2014 gubernatorial election, Torres was elected lieutenant governor on the Republican Party ticket headed by Eloy Songao Inos, and was sworn in on January 12, 2015.

Governorship

Tenure and elections 
Upon the death of incumbent governor Eloy Inos, Torres became the Governor of the Northern Mariana Islands on December 29, 2015. In accordance with the constitution, the Senate president, Victor Hocog, became lieutenant governor. In the 2018 gubernatorial election, Torres and his running mate Arnold Palacios won a full term, defeating former governor Juan Babauta and Rita Sablan ticket.

As Governor, Torres approved a bill, public law 19-42, that adds a $1,000 excise tax on pistol purchases, this is the highest tax on pistols sales in the US. However, this excessive tax was later ruled as unconstitutional according to the United States Constitution and overturned by the United States District Court.

On September 21, 2018, Torres signed into law the Taulamwaar Sensible CNMI Cannabis Act, stating: "Today, our people made history. We took a stand to legalize marijuana in the CNMI for recreational, medical, and commercial use."

Torres has announced his intention to run for reelection in the 2022 gubernatorial election with territorial senator Vinnie Sablan as his running-mate.

Controversies 
Torres and his wife, First Lady Diann Torres, were criticized for costing the government $24,297 on a trip to Montana. The trip, conducted from June 23 to July 2, 2017, involved stops in both Oregon and Idaho. In February 2018, Bloomberg Businessweek reported that Torres and his family have received millions of dollars in payments from Hong Kong-based Imperial Pacific casino. 

On November 7, 2019, the FBI executed a search and seizure warrant to raid Torres's office, home, and car as well as his brothers' law firm and various other businesses across Saipan for evidence of wire fraud, schemes to defraud, conspiracy, money laundering, and illegal campaign contributions.

In November 2019, the Northern Mariana Islands House of Representatives called for the impeachment of Torres amid an ongoing investigation by the FBI into his businesses. Torres faced further impeachment backlash with growing evidence of the misuse of local funds that violated CNMI procurement laws.
As of 12 January 2022, Ralph Torres is the second governor to have been impeached in the CNMI's history. 
In May 2022, Torres was acquitted of all charges by the Senate in his impeachment trial.

National politics 
On March 11, 2016, Torres endorsed frontrunner Donald Trump in the 2016 Republican presidential primary. Torres reiterated his support for Trump in the general election following the Access Hollywood controversy. 

Following the victory of Democrat Joe Biden in the 2020 presidential election, Torres congratulated the president-elect, while also praising Trump for his "commitment and support for the people of the Northern Mariana Islands". He added that the outgoing President "delivered time and time again for our people" through measures such as NMI U.S. Workforce Act of 2018, and praised Trump's response to the Super Typhoon Yutu.

Personal life 
Torres has six children with his wife, the former Diann Mendiola Tudela: Ralph Anthony, Vaniqa Marie, Deon Titus, Tristan Dane, Divannie and Ryan. Torres is of Chamorro ancestry.

See also 
Governor of the Northern Mariana Islands
Lieutenant Governor of the Northern Mariana Islands

References

External links

|-

|-

1979 births
21st-century American politicians
Boise State University alumni
Chamorro people
Governors of the Northern Mariana Islands
Impeached state and territorial governors of the United States
Lieutenant Governors of the Northern Mariana Islands
Living people
Northern Mariana Islands politicians
People from Saipan
Presidents of the Northern Mariana Islands Senate
Republican Party (Northern Mariana Islands) politicians
Republican Party governors of the Northern Mariana Islands